Robert Gary (born April 5, 1973) is a retired American track and field athlete who competed in the 3,000 meter steeplechase at the 1996 Summer Olympics and 2004 Summer Olympics.

Track and field career

College career
Gary ran for the Ohio State Buckeyes where he was a six-time All-American and was a Big Ten Conference champion.  Gary graduated from Ohio State in 1996.

International career
At the 1996 Olympic Trials Gary finished 2nd in the 3,000 meter Steeplechase to qualify for the 1996 Olympics.  At the 1996 Olympics, Gary finished 11th in the 1996 Summer Olympics Men's 3000 metres steeplechase heats.

At the 1999 World Team Trials, Gary finished 2nd to qualify for the 1999 World Championships in Athletics where he finished 7th in his heat race.

At the 2003 World Team Trials, Gary finished 3rd to qualify for the 2003 World Championships in Athletics where he finished 12th in his heat race.

At the 2004 Olympic Trials Gary finished 3rd in the 3,000 meter Steeplechase to qualify for the 2004 Olympics.  At the 2004 Olympics, Gary finished 12th in the 2004 Summer Olympics – Men's 3000 metres steeplechase heats.

Cross-Country
Gary was an accomplished cross-country runner, winning a national title in 2003 and having two top-3 finishes in 2004 at the national championships.  Gary competed in the 1998 and 2004 IAAF World Cross Country Championships.

Coaching career
Gary was the head cross-country coach (1996-2012) and head track and field coach (2006-2012) for the Ohio State Buckeyes. Gary is currently the head track and field and cross-country coach for the Furman Paladins.

References

1973 births
Living people
American male steeplechase runners
American male long-distance runners
Athletes (track and field) at the 1996 Summer Olympics
Athletes (track and field) at the 2004 Summer Olympics
Olympic track and field athletes of the United States
Athletes (track and field) at the 1999 Pan American Games
Pan American Games track and field athletes for the United States
World Athletics Championships athletes for the United States
Evanston Township High School alumni
Sportspeople from Evanston, Illinois
Ohio State Buckeyes men's track and field athletes